George D. Tablack (June 12, 1930 – October 20, 2001) was an American politician who served as a member of the Ohio House of Representatives, Mahoning County sheriff, and mayor of Campbell, Ohio.

Career 
During his tenure as a member of the Ohio House of Representatives, he was instrumental in obtaining funding for the Ohio University College of Osteopathic Medicine. The OOF Scholarship Program culminated in 1977 with the permanent endowment of a named scholarship funds in his honor, providing an annual award to an Ohio resident who aspires to practice family medicine in the state.

References

External links 
Tribute to George D. Tablack
Mahoning County Sheriff's Office

Democratic Party members of the Ohio House of Representatives
1930 births
2001 deaths
20th-century American politicians
Mayors of places in Ohio
People from Campbell, Ohio